In chess, the Dragon Variation is one of the main lines of the Sicilian Defence and begins with the moves:

1. e4 c5
2. Nf3 d6
3. d4 cxd4
4. Nxd4 Nf6 
5. Nc3 g6

In one of the most popular and theoretically important lines, the Yugoslav Variation, White meets Black's setup with Be3, Qd2 and Bh6, exchanging off the Dragon bishop, followed by launching a  pawn storm with h4–h5 and g4. To involve the a1-rook in the attack, White usually castles queenside, placing the white king on the semi-open c-file. The result is often both sides attacking the other's king with all available resources.

The modern form of the Dragon was originated by German master Louis Paulsen around 1880. It was played frequently by Henry Bird that decade, then received general acceptance around 1900 when played by Harry Nelson Pillsbury and other masters.

In his 1953 autobiography, the Russian chess master and amateur astronomer Fyodor Dus-Chotimirsky claimed that he coined the name "Dragon Variation" in 1901, after the fancied resemblance between Black's kingside pawn structure and the constellation Draco. The earliest known printed reference, found by chess historian Edward Winter, is in the Jan-Feb 1914 issue of Wiener Schachzeitung.

Main Line: 6.Be3 Bg7 7.f3 0-0 8.Qd2 Nc6 
The main line of the Dragon continues:

6. Be3 Bg7 7. f3
The point of White's last move is to safeguard e4 and to stop Black from playing ...Ng4 harassing White's dark-squared bishop. Black cannot play 6.Be3 Ng4?? immediately because of 7.Bb5+ either winning a piece after 7...Bd7 as white can play Qxg4 due to the pin on the d7 bishop, or winning an exchange and pawn after 7... Nc6 8. Nxc6 bxc6 9. Bxc6+ forking king and rook.

7... 0-0 8. Qd2 Nc6
and now there are fundamentally two distinct branches with 9. 0-0-0 leading to more positional play while 9. Bc4 leads to highly tactical double-edged positions.

The Yugoslav Attack with 9.Bc4 exemplifies the spirit of the Dragon with race-to-mate pawn storms on opposite sides of the board. White tries to break open the Black kingside and deliver mate down the h-file, while Black seeks counterplay on the queenside with sacrificial attacks. Typical White strategies are exchanging dark-squared bishops by Be3–h6, sacrificing material to open the h-file, and exploiting pressure on the a2–g8 diagonal and the weakness of the d5 square.

Black will typically counterattack on the queenside, using the queenside pawns, rooks, and dark squared bishop. Black sometimes plays ...h5 (the Soltis Variation) to defend against White's kingside attack.  Other typical themes for Black are exchanging White's light-square bishop by ...Nc6–e5–c4, pressure on the c-file, sacrificing the exchange on c3, advancing the b-pawn and pressure on the long diagonal. Black will generally omit ...a6 because White will generally win in a straight pawn attack since Black has given White a hook on g6 to attack. In general, White will avoid moving the pawns on a2/b2/c2, and so Black's pawn storm will nearly always be slower than White's on the kingside.  Black can frequently obtain an acceptable endgame even after sacrificing the exchange because of White's h-pawn sacrifice and doubled pawns.

The positional line with 9.0-0-0

After years of players believing that White's best play and chance for advantage lay in the main line with 9. Bc4, this older main line made a major comeback. White omits Bc4 in order to speed up the attack. It used to be thought that allowing 9...d5 here allows Black to equalize easily but further analysis and play have proven that things are not so clear cut. In fact, recently Black experienced a time of difficulty in the 9...d5 line facing a brilliant idea by Ivanchuk which seemed to give White the advantage. Some Black players began experimenting with 9...Bd7 and 9...Nxd4. A brilliancy found for White one day is soon enough overturned by some new resource for Black. A case in point is the following line where the evaluation of a major line was turned upside down overnight because of a queen sacrifice - Golubev credits "J. Diaz" and himself with discovering it independently in 1996: 9. 0-0-0 d5!? 10. Kb1!? Nxd4 11. e5! Nf5! 12. exf6 Bxf6 13. Nxd5 Qxd5! 14. Qxd5 Nxe3 15. Qd3 Nxd1 16. Qxd1 Be6!, where Black has almost sufficient compensation for the queen.

Yugoslav Attack with 9.Bc4

The purpose of 9.Bc4 is to prevent Black from playing the freeing move ...d6–d5. The variations resulting from this move are notorious for having been heavily analysed. In addition to covering d5, White's light-squared bishop helps cover White's queenside and controls the a2–g8 diagonal leading to Black's king. However, the bishop is exposed on c4 to an attack by a rook on c8, and usually has to retreat to b3, giving Black more time to organize his attack. Common in this line is an exchange sacrifice on c3 by Black to break up White's queenside pawns, and sacrifices to open up the long diagonal for Black's bishop on g7 are also common. An example of both ideas is the line 9. Bc4 Bd7 10. 0-0-0 Rc8 11. Bb3 Ne5 12. h4 Nc4 13. Bxc4 Rxc4 14. h5 Nxh5 15. g4 Nf6 16. Bh6 Nxe4! 17. Qe3 Rxc3!.

The Soltis Variation was the main line of the Dragon up until the late 1990s. Garry Kasparov played the move three times in the 1995 World Championship against Viswanathan Anand, scoring two wins and a draw. The line goes 9. Bc4 Bd7 10. 0-0-0 Rc8 11. Bb3 Ne5 12. h4 h5 (the key move, holding up White's kingside pawn advance). Other important deviations for Black are 12... Qa5 and 12... Nc4. More recently, White players have often avoided the Soltis by playing 12. Kb1, which has proven so effective that Black players have in turn tried to dodge this with 10... Rb8, known as the Chinese Dragon.

Classical Variation: 6.Be2 

The Classical Variation, 6. Be2, is the oldest White response to the Dragon. It is the second most common White response behind the Yugoslav Attack. After 6... Bg7, White has two main continuations:

 After 7. Be3 Nc6 8. 0-0 0-0, White's two main responses are 9. Nb3 and 9. Qd2. The knight move is a very common one in the Classical Variation and Qd2 is well met with 9... d5.
 After 7. 0-0 White has a choice of e3 and g5 for their bishop. If it is placed on e3, the game will usually transpose into the lines above. In his book Starting Out: The Sicilian Dragon, Andrew Martin calls Be3 "the traditional way of handling the variation", and describes Bg5 as being "much more dangerous" and "White's best chance to play for a win in the Classical Dragon." As with Be3, after Bg5, White will normally place their knight on b3, avoiding an exchange on d4.

Levenfish Attack: 6.f4 

The Levenfish Attack, 6. f4, is named after Russian GM Grigory Levenfish who recommended it in the 1937 Russian Chess Yearbook. It is not currently very common in the highest levels in chess. White prepares 7.e5, attacking Black's f6-knight. Therefore, 6... Nc6 or 6... Nbd7 is considered mandatory, as after 6... Bg7 7. e5 Nh5 8. Bb5+ Bd7 9. Qe2 Bxb5 10. Qxb5+ Nd7 11. Nf3 dxe5 12. fxe5 a6 13. Qe2 Qb6 14. Bd2 Qe6 15. O-O-O Nxe5 16. Rhe1 White has some initiative.

Harrington–Glek Variation: 6.Be3 Bg7 7.Be2 0-0 8.Qd2 

The Harrington–Glek Variation is another option for White. Named after Grandmaster Igor Glek who has devoted considerable effort evaluating the resulting positions for White. 6. Be3 Bg7 7. Be2 0-0 8. Qd2!? GM John Emms wrote, "Although it's difficult to beat the Yugoslav in terms of sharp, aggressive play, 7.Be2 0-0 8.Qd2!? also contains a fair amount of venom ... White's plans include queenside castling and a kingside attack. And there's a major plus point in that it's much, much less theoretical!"

After the main moves 8... Nc6 9. 0-0-0 we reach a tabiya for the position. 

Here Black has tested several options and here they are listed in order of popularity:

 9... Nxd4 This move can lead to both positional and attacking chances for both sides. White must keep aware that Black may have opportunities to offer an exchange sacrifice on c3 in order to exploit the unprotected e4 pawn. 10.Bxd4 Be6 11.Kb1! a good preparatory move in many lines of the Sicilian Dragon. White wants to be able to play Nd5 if the situation becomes conducive. White's king is also getting away from the open c-file which is where much of Black's counterplay can develop. 11...Qa5 With this move we reach a position where chances are roughly balanced and play can take on a life of its own.
 9... Bd7 This move allows Black to keep all his pieces on the board to mount an attack. 10.h4! h5! Black needs to keep White's pawns from making a breaking capture. 11.f3 Rc8 12.Kb1 Ne5 13.Bg5! Black can now go for broke with 13...b5!? with an interesting position.
 9... Ng4 This move is played to pick up the bishop pair by exploiting the absence of f3 in White's opening. White is usually fine with allowing the trade of bishop for knight considering that his light-square bishop does little in this line in comparison with the f6-knight's defensive abilities and White also will gain the use of f2–f3 to drive Black back after he recaptures with his bishop. 10.Bxg4 Bxg4 11.f3 Bd7 12.Kb1 Ne5 13.b3! Rc8 14.h4 Re8! Again, both sides have good chances.
 9... d5!? A pawn sacrifice similar to lines in the more common Yugoslav mainlines. 10.exd5 Nxd5 11.Nxc6 bxc6 12.Nxd5 cxd5 13.Qxd5 Qc7! giving up two rooks for the queen but keeping attacking chances. 14.Qxa8! Bf5 15.Qxf8+ Kxf8 16.Bd3! Be6 17.Kb1
 9... a6 10.Kb1 Nxd4 11.Bxd4 b5 12.h4! h5 13.f3 Be6 14.g4! J.Van der Wiel vs. H. Eidam, Gran Canaria 1996.

Other options
Other options on White's sixth move include 6. Bc4, 6. f3, and 6. g3.

When Black adopts the Dragon formation without 2...d6, White must watch out for ...d5 which often immediately equalises. Lines where Black does this include the Accelerated Dragon (1.e4 c5 2.Nf3 Nc6 3.d4 cxd4 4.Nxd4 g6) and Hyper-Accelerated Dragon (1.e4 c5 2.Nf3 g6).

Another option for Black is to play what has been called the "Dragodorf", which combines ideas from the Dragon with those of the Najdorf Variation. While this line may be played via the Dragon move order (see the Yugoslav Attack with 9.Bc4). Black can arrive at it with a Najdorf move order: 1.e4 c5 2.Nf3 d6 3.d4 cxd4 4.Nxd4 Nf6 5.Nc3 a6 6.Be3 g6 (or 5...g6 6.Be3 a6), with the idea of Bg7 and Nbd7. Such a move order would be used to try to avoid a Yugoslav type attack; for instance, after 1.e4 c5 2.Nf3 d6 3.d4 cxd4 4.Nxd4 Nf6 5.Nc3 a6, White could play 6.Be2 or 6.f4. In both cases, especially the latter, a Yugoslav-style attack loses some momentum. Usually the bishop is more ideally placed on c4, where it can pressure f7 and help defend the white king (though the 9.0-0-0 variation of the Dragon shows that this is not completely necessary), and if White plays f4 and then castles queenside, they must always be on guard for Ng4 ideas, something which the move f3 in traditional Dragon positions usually discourages. Nonetheless, a Yugoslav-style attack is still playable after both 6.Be2 g6 or 6.f4 g6.

Some famous exponents of the Dragon are Veselin Topalov, Andrew Soltis, Jonathan Mestel, Chris Ward, Sergei Tiviakov, Alexei Fedorov, Mikhail Golubev, the late Tony Miles and Eduard Gufeld. Garry Kasparov used the Dragon with success as a surprise weapon against world title challenger Viswanathan Anand in 1995 but did not use it subsequently. The Dragon saw its popularity declining in the late 1990s as a result of White resuscitating the old line with 9.0-0-0; however, recently there has been a resurgence  after a  number of new ideas in the 9.0-0-0 line were formulated by Dragon devotees.

ECO codes
The Encyclopaedia of Chess Openings (ECO) has ten codes for the Dragon Variation, B70 through B79.  After 1.e4 c5 2.Nf3 d6 3.d4 cxd4 4.Nxd4 Nf6, there is:

B70 5.Nc3 g6 
B71 5.Nc3 g6 6.f4 (Levenfish Variation)
B72 5.Nc3 g6 6.Be3 
B73 5.Nc3 g6 6.Be3 Bg7 7.Be2 Nc6 8.0-0 (Classical Variation)
B74 5.Nc3 g6 6.Be3 Bg7 7.Be2 Nc6 8.0-0 0-0 9.Nb3 
B75 5.Nc3 g6 6.Be3 Bg7 7.f3 (Yugoslav Attack)
B76 5.Nc3 g6 6.Be3 Bg7 7.f3 0-0 
B77 5.Nc3 g6 6.Be3 Bg7 7.f3 0-0 8.Qd2 Nc6 9.Bc4 
B78 5.Nc3 g6 6.Be3 Bg7 7.f3 0-0 8.Qd2 Nc6 9.Bc4 Bd7 10.0-0-0 
B79 5.Nc3 g6 6.Be3 Bg7 7.f3 0-0 8.Qd2 Nc6 9.Bc4 Bd7 10.0-0-0 Qa5 11.Bb3 Rfc8 12.h4

See also
 Sicilian Defence, Accelerated_Dragon
 Sicilian Defence §Hyper-Accelerated Dragon: 2...g6
 List of chess openings

References

Further reading

External links

Sicilian, Dragon Variation by Bill Wall
Mikhail Golubev – Experimenting With the Dragon

Chess openings